Pain Narenj Lengeh (also Romanized as Pā’īn Nārenj Lengeh) is a village in Ahandan Rural District, in the Central District of Lahijan County, Gilan Province, Iran. At the 2006 census, its population was 192, in 40 families.

References 

Populated places in Lahijan County